10th CFCA Awards
March 1, 1998

Best Film: 
 L.A. Confidential 
The 10th Chicago Film Critics Association Awards, given on 1 March 1998, honored the finest achievements in 1997 filmmaking.

Winners
Best Actor: 
Robert Duvall - The Apostle
Best Actress: 
Judi Dench - Mrs. Brown
Best Cinematography: 
Titanic - Russell Carpenter
Best Director: 
Curtis Hanson - L.A. Confidential
Best Film: 
L.A. Confidential
Best Foreign Language Film: 
Shall we dansu? (Shall We Dance?), Japan
Best Score: 
"Titanic" - James Horner
Best Supporting Actor: 
Burt Reynolds - Boogie Nights
Best Supporting Actress: 
Debbi Morgan - Eve's Bayou
Most Promising Actor: 
Matt Damon - Good Will Hunting
Most Promising Actress: 
Joey Lauren Adams - Chasing Amy

References
http://www.chicagofilmcritics.org/index.php?option=com_content&view=article&id=49&Itemid=59
http://articles.chicagotribune.com/1998-01-13/news/9801140197_1_titanic-chicago-film-critics-films

 1997
1997 film awards